South Central Cartel is an American West Coast hip hop/gangsta rap group based in Los Angeles, California.

Discography

Studio albums

Collaboration albums

Compilation albums
Greatest Hits (2003)
The Greatest Hits Vol. 2 (2006)
Cartel or Die: SCC's Most Gangsta (2007)
SC Cartel Camp Presents Hood Favorites (2010)

Extended plays
2 Da West (2019)

Singles

Other related releases
 1993 : Havoc & Prodeje - Livin' in a Crime Wave
 1993 : Rhyme Poetic Mafia - Reign of Terror
 1994 : Havoc & Prodeje - Kickin' Game
 1995 : Mel-Low - It's a B.G. Thang
 1996 : Young Murder Squad - How We Livin'''
 1996 : Sh'Killa - Gangstrez from da Bay 1996 : L.V. - I Am L.V. 1996 : Havoc & Prodeje, South Central Cartel & L.V. - The Gangstas In South Central 1997 : Havoc & Prodeje - Prelude to the Peace (UK only)
 1997 : Young Rome & Evil Skeem - The War is On 1997 : Havoc & Prodeje - Truez Neva Stop 1998 : Young Prodeje - Diablo Flame On - Movie On Wax 1998 : Rhyme Poetic Mafia - The Root of All Evil 2000 : Hava Rochie (aka Havoc) - Self Made Legend: It's My Time to Shine 2000 : L.V. - How Long 2002 : L.V. & Prodeje - The Playground 2002 : Gangsta Reese (YMS) - Full Metal Jacket 2003 : Young Murder Squad - Don't B Scared 2004 : Big Prodeje - Hood Music 2004 : Big Prodeje - Random Violence (released in Japan)
 2005 : Big Prodeje - If the Chucc Fits, Wear It! 2007 : Big Prodeje - Hood 2 Da Good 2007 : Hot Dolla (Murder Squad) - Streetz on Lock (EP)
 2008 : Havikk the Rhime Son - The Rhime Son 2008 : Havikk the Rhime Son & Hirntot Posse - Worldwide Cartel 2008 : L.V. & Prodeje - Hood Affiliated 2008 : Young Prodeje - Gangsta Life 2010 : L.V. - Hustla 4 Life 2010 : Big Prodeje & DJ AK - What Side U On ? 2010 : Big Prodeje feat. Nasty prod. Ill Slim Collin - Till we die 2012 : Big Willie & Big Prodeje - Everythang Hood (EP)
 2013 : Big Prodeje AKA Mr. Hood Good - The Realest Shit Ya Never Heard 2016 : D.CrazE the Destroyer ft. Insane LOC, South Central Cartel - The Reaper Project 2021 : Big Prodeje & Arcyn Al prod. Ill Slim Collin - On meGuest appearances
 "Six Million Ways" (Killafornia Organization featuring Prodeje, Havoc & Young Prodeje from Killafornia Organization'') (1996)

References

Hip hop groups from California
Def Jam Recordings artists
Gangsta rap groups
Musical groups from Los Angeles
G-funk groups